Nowinka ,, is a village in Augustów County, Podlaskie Voivodeship, in north-eastern Poland. It is the seat of the gmina (administrative district) called Gmina Nowinka.

The village has a population of 300.

References

Villages in Augustów County
Suwałki Governorate
Białystok Voivodeship (1919–1939)